Victor I, Duke of Ratibor, Prince of Corvey, Prince of Hohenlohe-Schillingsfürst  (10 February 181830 January 1893) was a member of House of Hohenlohe-Schillingsfürst and later Duke of the Silesian duchy of Ratibor and Prince of Corvey.

Early life and family
Victor  was born at Langenburg, Kingdom of Württemberg, eldest son of Franz Joseph, 5th Prince of Hohenlohe-Schillingsfürst (1787–1841), (son of Karl Albrecht II, Prince of Hohenlohe-Schillingsfürs and Baroness Judith Reviczky of Revisnye) and his wife, Princess Constanze of Hohenlohe-Langenburg (1792–1847), (daughter of Karl Ludwig, Prince of Hohenlohe-Langenburg and Countess Amalie of Solms-Baruth).

After initial private lessons, he attended the Royal Grammar School in Erfurt.  He then studied law and modern languages in Göttingen, Bonn, Heidelberg and Lausanne. He also traveled to Switzerland, Italy, France and England.

He subsequently managed the property of his uncle, the Landgrave of Hesse-Rotenburg, Victor Amadeus. These included the former monastery of Corvey in Westphalia, Ratibor in Upper Silesia. This area was 34,000 hectares in size and consisted mainly of forest areas.

Victor was created Duke of Ratibor and Prince of Corvey on 15 October 1840 by King Frederick William IV of Prussia.

His younger brother Chlodwig was Chancellor of Germany and Minister President of Prussia from 1894 to 1900.

Military career
During his military service, made at an early age in the cavalry. In the 1850s he commanded in repeated exercises the 2nd -Landwehr Regiment. During the Austro-Prussian War and the Franco-Prussian War, he organized as Chairman of the Silesian Association Knights Voluntary Health Care. Since 1872, he led the honorary title of General of Cavalry à la suite.

In 1893, he was elected as the first president of the German Experimental Institute for Small Arms.

Political career
In 1847 Ratibor was a member of the Prussian United Diet. Between 1856 and 1893 he was a member of provincial parliament for Silesia Province. At first he was Marshal of the Assembly. After the introduction of the new provincial order, he was repeatedly chairman. He was also from 1849 to 1852 on the second chamber of the Prussian State Parliament. In 1850 Ratibor was a member of the Erfurt Union Parliament. From 1867 to 1870 he was a member of the North German Reichstag, and from 1872 to 1890 of the German Reichstag. He was also member from 1854 to 1893 of the Prussian House of Lords. In the latter, he was co-founder of the New Group in 1870/72, from 1877 to 1893 President of the House.

Ratibor was one of the liberal-conservative Aristocracy, political reformants, he was a supporter of Otto von Bismarck. He was also one of the founders of the Free Conservative Party.

Marriage
Victor married 19 April 1845 at Donaueschingen to Princess Amélie of Fürstenberg (1821–1899), third child of Karl Egon II, Prince of Fürstenberg, and his wife, Princess Amalie of Baden.

They had ten children:
Princess Amelia of Hohenlohe-Schillingsfürst (3 October 1846 – 25 August 1847)
Viktor II, Duke of Ratibor (6 September 1847 – 9 August 1923), married in 1867 to Countess Maria Breunner-Enkevoirth, had issue.
Prince Franz of Hohenlohe-Schillingsfürst (6 April 1849 – 27 May 1925)
Princess Elisabeth of Hohenlohe-Schillingsfürst (27 February 1851 – 5 October 1928)
Prince Egon of Hohenlohe-Schillingsfürst (4 January 1853 – 10 February 1896), married in 1885 to Princess Leopoldine of Lobkowicz, had issue.
Princess Marie of Hohenlohe-Schillingsfürst (27 June 1854 – 29 May 1928)
Prince Maximilian of Hohenlohe-Schillingsfürst (9 February 1856 – 12 January 1924), married in 1882 to Countess Franziska Grimaud  d'Orsay, had issue.
Prince Ernst of Hohenlohe-Schillingsfürst (10 Nov 1857 – 25 February 1891)
Prince Karl Egon of Hohenlohe-Schillingsfürst (7 July 1860 – 4 June 1940)
Princess Margaret of Hohenlohe-Schillingsfürst (3 June 1863 – 4 June 1940)

Honours
He received the following orders and decorations:

Ancestry

Notes and sources
 Genealogisches Handbuch des Adels, Fürstliche Häuser, Reference: 1956
 
 Tiggesbäumker, Günter: Viktor I. Herzog von Ratibor und Fürst von Corvey, Prinz zu Hohenlohe-Schillingsfürst (1818–1893). In: Westfälische Zeitschrift. Band 144, 1994. p. 266–280. Digitalisat
 Tiggesbäumker, Günter: Von Franken nach Westfalen und Schlesien. Der Erbprinz von Hohenlohe-Schillingsfürst wird erster Herzog von Ratibor und Fürst von Corvey. In: Frankenland. 3/2003. p. 207–212.
 Tiggesbäumker, Günter: Das Herzogliche Haus Ratibor und Corvey. 7. erweiterte Auflage. Werl: Börde-Verlag, 2012. (Deutsche Fürstenhäuser. 5.)

References

External links

|-

|-

1818 births
1893 deaths
People from Langenburg
People from the Kingdom of Württemberg
House of Hohenlohe
German Roman Catholics
German landowners
Political party founders
Free Conservative Party politicians
Members of the Prussian House of Lords
Members of the 2nd Reichstag of the German Empire
Members of the 3rd Reichstag of the German Empire
Members of the 4th Reichstag of the German Empire
Members of the 5th Reichstag of the German Empire
Members of the 6th Reichstag of the German Empire
Members of the 7th Reichstag of the German Empire
Generals of Cavalry (Prussia)
Recipients of the Iron Cross, 2nd class
Knights of the Golden Fleece of Austria
Grand Officiers of the Légion d'honneur
Knights Grand Cross of the Order of St Gregory the Great
Knights Grand Cross of the Order of Pope Pius IX
Knights of Malta